H9, H09 or H-9 can refer to:
 H9 (bus route), a Huntington Area Rapid Transit bus route in Suffolk County, New York
 H9 Groveway, a road in the Milton Keynes grid road system
 H-09 (Michigan county highway)
 British NVC community H9, a type of heath community in the British National Vegetation Classification
 DSC-H9, a 2007 Sony Cyber-shot H series camera
 Highway H09 (Ukraine), a road in Ukraine
 HMS Acasta (H09), a 1929 British Royal Navy A class destroyer
 HMS H9, a 1915 British Royal Navy H class submarine
 HMS Rotherham (H09), a 1942 British Royal Navy R class destroyer
 London Buses route H9
 PRR H9, an American 2-8-0 steam locomotive model
 USS H-9 (SS-152), a 1918 United States Navy H class submarine 
and also :
 the IATA code for Pegasus Airlines, a Turkey-based airline
 Halloween (2007 film), the 9th film in the Halloween film series